The ARP Odyssey is an analog synthesizer introduced by ARP Instruments in 1972.

History

ARP developed the Odyssey as a direct competitor to the Moog Minimoog and an answer to the demand for more affordable, portable, and less complicated "performance" synthesizers.

ARP produced several versions of the Odyssey from 1972 to 1980. In early 2015, Korg reissued the Odyssey in cooperation with the original designer and ARP co-founder, David Friend.

Design

The Odyssey is a two-oscillator analog synthesizer, and one of the first with duophonic capabilities (the ability to play two notes at the same time). All parameters, including a resonant low-pass filter, a non-resonant high-pass filter, ADSR and AR envelopes, a sine and square wave LFO, and a sample-and-hold function are controllable with sliders and switches on the front panel.

Features

Switchable between sawtooth, square, and pulse waveforms with oscillator sync, a "ring modulator", and pink or white noise. (As with the Korg MS-20, the "ring modulator" is actually a logical exclusive-OR between the two VCOs' pulse waves.)

Pulse-width can be modulated manually or with the LFO or the ADSR envelope generator. There is a (static) high-pass filter, as well as a voltage controlled low-pass self-oscillating filter.
The filter can be controlled by either of the two envelope generators, an ADSR (attack, decay, sustain, release) and a simple AR (attack, release) and modulated by the LFO, sample-and-hold, the keyboard, or a separate CV (pedal) input on the back panel.
The Sample/Hold input mixer can be used to route the output of the VCOs to the FM input of VCO 2 and the VCF, enabling audio frequency FM.

ARP Odyssey models

Odyssey Mk I (Model 2800)

ARP Odysseys produced between 1972 and 1975, referred to as Mk I, were white-faced Odysseys that used a 2-pole voltage-controlled filter, which were similar to Oberheim SEM modules. Some late models used a black and gold color scheme and include CV/gate jacks like the later Mk II's. These earlier units contained a greater number of internal adjustments and were slightly more difficult to calibrate.

Odyssey Mk II (Model 2810-2815)

Odyssey Mk II's were produced between 1975 and 1978. They are largely similar to Mk I's; the main differences are the use of the black and gold color scheme and the inclusion of CV/gate in all models. These models also use a four-pole VCF, which were similar in design to Moog's four-pole filter. Subsequent models, however, use a different four-pole low-pass filter designed by ARP, the 4075 filter. A later filter with a similar design, the 4072, was used in the 2600, Omni, Axxe, Solus, and other ARP instruments.

Odyssey Mk III (Model 2820-2823)

Odyssey Mk III was introduced in 1978, with a redesigned chassis and orange-on-black color scheme consistent with other contemporary ARP instruments. The Mk III featured ARP's new four-pole "4075" filter, and have an unbalanced XLR output in addition to unbalanced 1/4" outputs. The rotary knob-controlled pitch bend featured on the Mk I and Mk II models was replaced by proportional pitch control (PPC), which utilized 3 pressure-sensitive buttons to control bend up, bend down, and vibrato. ARP included PPC on other instruments, and also offered a kit to add PPC to earlier Odyssey synthesizers.

Production of the Odyssey Mk III ceased when ARP Instruments declared bankruptcy in 1981.

Software emulations

In 2002, GForce Software released Oddity, a software synthesizer version of the ARP Odyssey, with additional features like a sub oscillator and increased modulation options offered by X-LFO and X-ADSR.

On Nov 1, 2016 Korg announced the ARP ODYSSEi app for iOS.

Hardware re-issues and recreations

Korg ARP Odyssey

The ARP Odyssey was reissued by Korg in 2015.  86% of the size of the ARP's original Odyssey with a "slim keys" keyboard, the analog signal path of Korg's reissue is similar to the original, with several updates like MIDI input and USB MIDI connectivity, a separate headphone output and balanced XLR output, and a "drive" switch to add distortion to the voltage-controlled amplifier. Korg released Mark I and Mark II color schemes as limited editions, with the Mark III color scheme as the standard model. All three versions included the three filter circuits from the original Odyssey models, with the ability to switch between them. All models also featured the ability to switch between two portamento behaviors from the original models.

Korg later released an ARP Odyssey Module, consisting of the synthesizer and controls without the keyboard. Korg's ARP Odyssey Module features minor MIDI implementation improvements.

A limited edition, full-size reproduction of the original ARP Odyssey was released by Korg in all three classic color schemes as the ARP Odyssey FS.

Behringer Odyssey

In August 2019, Behringer released its own version of the Odyssey. Utilizing the orange-on-black color scheme of ARP's Odyssey Mark III, the Behringer Odyssey features a full-size 37-key keyboard and all three versions of the filter from the original ARP Odyssey models. Additional features not found on the original include MIDI, digital effects, a 32-step sequencer, and arpeggiator.

Notable users
The following is a partial list of artists and musical groups who have used the ARP Odyssey:
 ABBA - on "Gimme! Gimme! Gimme! (A Man After Midnight)"
 Devo
 John Foxx - on his album Metamatic
 Herbie Hancock - on "Chameleon"
Used as lead instrument of Peter Howell's incarnation of the Doctor Who theme.
 Jean-Michel Jarre - on his album Oxygène
 Manfred Mann's Earth Band - on "Blinded by the Light"
 Dominique Perrier, who borrowed the synth from French singer Christophe in the 1970s.
 Ultravox - on "Vienna"
 Edgar Winter - on "Frankenstein"
 Joe Walsh on "Rocky Mountain Way" and “Life's Been Good”
 Jon Lord of Deep Purple used an ARP Odyssey on the 1974 album Burn.
 Latvian space-rock band Zodiac 
 James (JY) Young of Styx on "Come Sail Away" from their 1977 album The Grand Illusion
 Yellow Magic Orchestra used an ARP Odyssey MkIII on their 1979 TransAtlantic tour, Technopolis 2000-20, and 80' World Tour.

References

Further reading

External links

Ultimate Odyssey Information Resource Web Site
Odyssey entry at Synth Museum
Odyssey entry at Vintage Synth Explorer
RetroSound-ARP Odyssey 
Korg ARP Odyssey on the official ARP Synthesizers website
Korg Unveils ARP Odyssey Analog Synthesizer

ARP synthesizers
Korg synthesizers
Analog synthesizers
Polyphonic synthesizers